Fidena leucopogon is a species of fly in the family Tabanidae.

Distribution
Brazil.

References

Tabanidae
Insects described in 1828
Diptera of South America
Insects of Brazil
Taxa named by Christian Rudolph Wilhelm Wiedemann